Robert L. Braddy Sr. is an American college baseball coach who spent 27 years as the coach for Jackson State University.

Braddy is from Florence, Mississippi. He attended Jackson State University and played college baseball for the Jackson State Tigers. He coached the Tigers from 1973 through 2000, retiring with an 824–546 win–loss record, establishing a new Southwestern Athletic Conference (SWAC) record for wins. Braddy's teams also won 12 SWAC championships and reached the NCAA Division I baseball tournament three times. After stepping down as coach, Braddy served as athletic director until 2011.

Jackson State named their baseball field Braddy Field in his honor in 2009. Braddy was elected to the American Baseball Coaches Association Hall of Fame in 2003, the National College Baseball Hall of Fame in 2016, and the Mississippi Sports Hall of Fame in 2017.

References

Living people
African-American baseball players
Baseball players from Mississippi
National College Baseball Hall of Fame inductees
Jackson State Tigers and Lady Tigers athletic directors
Jackson State Tigers baseball coaches
Jackson State Tigers baseball players
People from Florence, Mississippi
1941 births
21st-century African-American people
20th-century African-American sportspeople